Speedlink Vanguard was a  train ferry which was built in 1973 as Stena Shipper. She was charted to a New Zealand operator on completion and renamed Union Wellington and saw further service as Alpha Express and Stena Shipper before entering service with Sealink as Speedlink Vanguard.

She saw further service under the names Caribe Express, Stena Shipper, Kirk Shipper, Normandie Shipper Bonavista, Boa Vista and Birlik 1 before being scrapped in 2013. The ship sailed under the flags of the Bahamas, Bermuda, the Cayman Islands, Greece, New Zealand, Panama, Sweden, Turkey and West Germany at various points in her career.

Description
The ship had a capacity of 12 passengers.

The ship had a capacity of 36 passengers.

History
Stena Shipper was built in 1973 by A Vuyk & Zonen's Scheepswerven, Amsterdam, Netherlands as Yard Number 864. Launched on 16 June 1973 and completed in September, she was allocated the IMO Number 7325241.

On completion, Stena Shipper was chartered to the Union Steam Ship Company of New Zealand and transferred to the New Zealand flag. She was renamed Union Wellington on 2 November 1973. The charter ended in 1975 and she returned to Europe. She was reflagged to West Germany on 26 January 1977 during tests after her rebuilt and was then reflagged to Greece the next day. She was chartered to Aghiris Lines, Piraeus and renamed Alpha Express. Following the bankruptcy of Aghiris Lines in 1979, she was arrested at Mombasa, Kenya.

In May 1981, Alpha Express was sent to Smith's Dock, Middlesbrough, Tyne & Wear for conversion to a train ferry. In August she was chartered to Sealink and renamed Speedlink Vanguard. She had a capacity of 56 railway wagons. Speedlink Vanguagrd entered service on the Harwich – Zeebrugge route on 21 August. There were no injuries amongst the 28 crew on Speedlink Vanguard. Speedlink Vanguard re-entered service ten days later following repairs. The charter to Sealink ended on 30 January 1987. Following a Court of Inquiry, the captains of both vessels were blamed for the collision. An inquest recorded an open verdict on all six victims of the accident after the jury were unable to agree on a verdicts of accident, or misadventure. On 6 January 1987, Speedlink Vanguard lost engine power and steering in a Force 8 gale in the North Sea and issued a Mayday. Power was later restored and she arrived safely at Harwich.

The ship was renamed Caribe Express in 1987 and then Stena Shipper and Kirk Shipper in 1988. She was transferred to Northern Marine Inc., Cayman Islands in 1988 and then to Stena Ferries Ltd, Cayman Islands later that year. Between April and June 1989 the ship was rebuilt at Lloyd Werft, Bremerhaven, West Germany, following which she was chartered to Truckline Ferries, Caen, France and renamed Normandie Shipper. She was reflagged to the Bahamas with Nassau as her port of registry. She served on the Caen – Portsmouth and Cherbourg – Poole routes. Following amendments to the SOLAS Convention in 1990, Normandie Shipper was listed by the British Department of Transport as one of the ships needing modifications to fully meet the new SOLAS 90 standard. Following the end of the charter, she was laid up at Caen in October 1995.

She was then sold to Adecon Shipping Ltd, Bahamas and renamed Bonavista. Rebuilt in Świnoujście, Poland in April 2000 for a planned charter to Falcon Seafreight, Bonavista was then laid up at Świnoujście until July 2001 when she was sold to Kyst-Link A/S, Nassau and renamed Boa Vista. She operated the Brevik – Holmestrand – Hirtshals route for a year before transferring to the Hirtshals – Langesund route. On 26 March 2003, Boa Vista collided with the breakwater at Hirtshals. Two days later, she was sold to Trond A Kittelsen Shipping, A/S, Brevik, remaining on the Hirtshals – Langesund route.

On 16 June 2004, Boa Vista was sold to Kittilsen Shipping, Panama. She was chartered to HUAL. She was operated by Thraki Med RoRo Lines on the Volos – Izmir route from September 2006. On 3 November 2007, Boa Vista was sold to Thraki Shipping Co SA, Panama and renamed Birlik 1. She was registered to Birlik RoRo Isletmeleri AS, Istanbul, Turkey in December 2007. She was used on the Zonguldak – Skadovsk route. Boa Vista arrived at Aliağa, Turkey for scrapping on 1 June 2013.

References

1973 ships
Ships built in Amsterdam
Ships of the Stena Line
Merchant ships of Sweden
Merchant ships of New Zealand
Merchant ships of West Germany
Merchant ships of Greece
Merchant ships of Bermuda
Merchant ships of the United Kingdom
Train ferries
Ships of British Rail
Maritime incidents in 1982
Merchant ships of the Cayman Islands
Merchant ships of France
Merchant ships of Panama
Ferries of Turkey